Reunion is an album by Odyssey the Band featuring guitarist James Blood Ulmer, violinist Charlie Burnham and drummer Warren Benbrow which was recorded in 1997 and released on the Knitting Factory label. This album reunites the musicians who originally recorded Odyssey in 1983 for the Columbia label.

Reception

The Allmusic review by Tom Schulte awarded the album 4 stars, and stated, "The themes build slowly, transform and return in a delivery that is emotional and intimate. It may take several listens to get used to Ulmer's nasal, narrow range, but the album is solid and worth repeated listens, and the tracks are well-arranged". Robert Christgau said it was "a record that starts atmospheric, turns songful, and ropes you in with a sound either way"

Track listing
All compositions by James Blood Ulmer
 "No Other Option" – 5:16
 "Channel 1" – 6:09
 "Running Man" – 2:58
 "I Believe in You" – 6:24
 "Online Junkie" – 5:41
 "I Am" – 6:21
 "Love Dance" – 6:45
 "Where Did All the Girls Come From" – 8:00
 "Alham du Allah" – 6:58

Personnel
James "Blood" Ulmer – guitar, vocals
Charlie Burnham – violin
Warren Benbrow – drums

References

1997 albums
Knitting Factory Records albums
James Blood Ulmer albums